The 2005 FIBA Africa Championship for Women was the 17th FIBA Africa Championship for Women, played under the rules of FIBA, the world governing body for basketball, and the FIBA Africa thereof. The tournament was hosted by Nigeria from December 20 to 28, with the games played at the Indoor Sports Hall in Abuja.

Nigeria defeated Senegal 64–57 in the final to win their first title with both teams securing a spot at the 2006 FIBA Women's World Cup.

Squads

Draw

Preliminary round 
Times given below are in UTC.

Group A

Group B

Knockout stage

9th place match

7th place match

5th place match

Semifinals bracket

Semifinals

Bronze medal match

Final

Final standings

Nigeria rosterAisha Mohammed, Funmilayo Ojelabi, Mactabene Amachree, Mary Apiafi, Mfon Udoka, Mobolaji Akiode, Nwamaka Adibeli, Oluchi Okorie, Patricia Chukwuma, Priscilla Udeaja, Rashidat Sadiq, Ugo Oha, Coach: Scott Nnaji

Awards

All-Tournament Team

Statistical Leaders

Individual Tournament Highs

Points

Rebounds

Assists

Steals

Blocks

Fouls

Individual Game Highs

Team Tournament Highs

Points

Rebounds

Assists

Steals

Blocks

Fouls

2-point field goal percentage

3-point field goal percentage

Free throw percentage

Team Game highs

See also
 2005 FIBA Africa Women's Clubs Champions Cup

External links
Official Website

References

2005
2005 in women's basketball
2005 in Nigerian sport
2005 in African basketball
International basketball competitions hosted by Nigeria